Ptosha Storey (born January 4, 1968) is an American actress and stage director, known for her role as Nancy Hallsen in the BET prime time soap opera, The Oval.

Life and career
Storey was born in Memphis, Tennessee but she grew up in the projects of Dallas, Texas. She graduated from Booker T. Washington High School for the Performing and Visual Arts. She later attended Southern Methodist University. She has a son, Jordan L. Jones who also works as an actor. He starred in the short-lived Fox sitcom Rel.

Storey began acting in 1990s, appearing on television. She had secondary role in the 1996 television film The Road to Galveston starring Cicely Tyson. She guest starred on episodes of Wishbone , Strong Medicine and Numb3rs. She had many roles in theatre, include playing Ruth Younger in A Raisin in the Sun. She worked as assistant director in The Mountaintop, The Color Purple, Don't Bother Me, I Can't Cope, and Ain't Misbehavin'.

In 2016, Storey was cast in a recurring role in the Oprah Winfrey Network prime time soap opera, If Loving You Is Wrong produced by Tyler Perry. She later had a recurring role in the Fox prime time soap opera Empire. In 2018, Perry cast her in his thriller film Acrimony for playing Taraji P. Henson's character younger sister. The following year, Storey began starring in the BET prime time soap opera, The Oval, also created and produced by Tyler Perry. In December, 2020, she joined the cast of CBS daytime soap opera, The Young and the Restless playing Naya Benedict. She received Daytime Emmy Award for Outstanding Guest Performer in a Drama Series nomination for her performance at the 49th Daytime Emmy Awards.

Filmography

References

External links

21st-century American actresses
African-American actresses
American television actresses
American soap opera actresses
Living people
Southern Methodist University alumni
Year of birth missing (living people)
21st-century African-American women